Mt. Zion African Methodist Episcopal Church, Mt. Zion A.M.E. Church or other variants thereof, may refer to:

 Mount Zion AME Zion Church (Montgomery, Alabama)
 Mount Zion AME Church (Jacksonville, Florida)
 Mount Zion A.M.E. Church (Ocala, Florida)
 Mount Zion African Methodist Episcopal Church (Montgomery Township, New Jersey)
 Mount Zion African Methodist Episcopal Church and Mount Zion Cemetery, Woolwich, New Jersey
 Mount Zion A.M.E. Church (Tredyffrin Township, Chester County, Pennsylvania)
 Mount Zion AME Church (Greeleyville, South Carolina)

See also
Mount Zion Church (disambiguation)